Grande-Rivière (literally Great River) is a former commune in the Jura department in Bourgogne-Franche-Comté in eastern France. On 1 January 2019, it was merged into the new commune Grande-Rivière Château.

Population

See also
Communes of the Jura department

References

Former communes of Jura (department)